158 Regiment Royal Logistic Corps, is a reserve regiment of the British Army's Royal Logistic Corps. The Regiment's role is to provide logistical support to the Regular Army through its paired regular regiment, 7 Regiment RLC, as well as providing soldiers when required. 158 Regiment currently falls under the command 102 Logistics Brigade.

History

The regiment was formed in 1996 by converting the 5th Battalion, the Royal Anglian Regiment from the infantry to transport role.  160 Squadron was formed in Lincoln in July 2014 as part of the Army 2020 restructuring.

Structure
The current structure is as follows:
200 (Peterborough) HQ Squadron 
201 (Bedford) Transport Squadron 
202 (Ipswich) Transport Squadron 
203 (Loughborough) Transport Squadron (Resubordinated under 159 RLC as of Spring 2023)
160 (Lincoln) Transport Squadron - formed in July 2014

Honorary Colonels
The following is a list of the Honorary Colonels of the Regiment:

Lady Victoria Leatham DL (1996 to 5 April 2003)
Vacant (5 April 2003 to 1 November 2003)
Major General (now General) Sir Nick Houghton (1 November 2003 to 1 September 2008)
Major General David John Shouesmith (1 September 2008 to 2013)
Colonel Mark Underhill OBE late RLC (1 November 2013 to present)

References

External links
 Official Website

Regiments of the Royal Logistic Corps
Military units and formations established in 1996